The Territorial Sundial by John W. Elliot is installed on the Washington State Capitol campus in Olympia, Washington, United States. Dedicated on January 23, 1959, the sundial is made of brass and Wilkeson sandstone, with bronze rods.

References

1959 establishments in Washington (state)
1959 sculptures
Brass sculptures
Bronze sculptures in Washington (state)
Outdoor sculptures in Olympia, Washington
Sandstone sculptures in the United States
Washington State Capitol campus